Anaxyrus is a genus of true toads in the family Bufonidae. The genus is endemic to North and Central America. Some authors consider Anaxyrus to be a subgenus within Bufo.

Species

References

External links

Further reading
Tschudi JJ (1845). "Reptilium conspectus quae in Republica Peruana reperiuntur et pleraque observata vel collecta sunt in itinere". Archiv für Naturgeschichte 11 (1): 150–170. (Anaxyrus, new genus, p. 170). (in Latin)

 
Taxa named by Johann Jakob von Tschudi